The Théâtre des Capucines was a former theatre on the boulevard des Capucines in the 2nd arrondissement of Paris. It was built in 1889 by architect Édouard-Jean Niermans and then taken over by two brothers, Émile Isola and Vincent Isola, in 1892 to become the Théâtre Isola. They managed the theatre until 1897.

Berthez Armand was an early director and the actress-dancer Gaby Deslys (1881-1920) appeared there. The actress, singer and film star Arletty made her debut there in October 1919 and performed there regularly for ten years, especially in operettas. It was also the venue of the 1941 musical comedy Une femme par jour, (with music by  Georges Van Parys and text by Pierre Véber and Jean Boyer). Serge Gainsbourg inaugurated a series of popular concerts at the theatre in 1963, including an appearance by the singer Barbara.

The theatre finally in 1970 and was taken over by the perfume company Fragonard which has preserved the building as a perfume museum, the Théâtre-Musée des Capucines.

Premières
1899: L'ami de la maison by Pierre Veber, comedy in one act, 17 January 1899
1900: Blancheton père et fils by Pierre Veber, one-act fantasia, 26 October 1900
1904: Rose Mousse, by Lecocq, comédie musicale in one act, 28 January 1904
1905: La salutiste, by Lecocq, opéra monologue in one act, 14 January 1905

See also
Théâtre-Musée des Capucines

References

External links 
 Theatre des Capucines

Former theatres in Paris
Buildings and structures in the 2nd arrondissement of Paris
Theatres completed in 1889
Édouard Niermans buildings